Roger François Jouret (born 24 February 1954), better known as Plastic Bertrand, is a Belgian musician, songwriter, producer, editor and television presenter, best known for the 1977 international hit single "Ça plane pour moi".

Biography

Early life and bands

Jouret was born in Brussels to a French father and Ukrainian mother. At the age of nine, he became a singer and drummer in the 'Buffalo Scouts Band', a group he formed with the Boy Scouts, which performed covers of Rolling Stones songs. He then formed a band called The Pelicans, who performed at parties. They changed their name to Passing the Time, extending their act in bars, clubs and at festivals along the Dutch and Belgian coast. Later he was hired by pirate radio station Radio Veronica.

Meanwhile, he continued his education at the Music Academy studying music theory and percussion, passing his degree at the Athénée Adolphe Max. Whilst awaiting admission to the Royal Conservatory of Music in Brussels, he spent a year at the Saint-Luc Institute studying design.

In 1973 he entered the Conservatory to study music theory, percussion and music history. Influenced by the punk movement, he formed the band Hubble Bubble in 1974, sharing his time between study at the Conservatory, rehearsals and concerts with the band, and work as stage manager at the Theatre des Galeries. In 1978 Hubble Bubble released their first of two albums, also titled Hubble Bubble. Jouret is credited as the songwriter, singer and drummer under the name "Roger Junior". Unfortunately, the group's bass player was killed in an accident returning from a rehearsal, and the group disbanded.

The band manager of Hubble Bubble (Bernard Schol) presented Roger Jouret to the singer/composer/producer Lou Deprijck who had just recorded "Ca plane pour moi" in studio with vocals he performed.

As Plastic Bertrand
In 1977, Plastic Bertrand started his solo career as the credited artist of the international hit single "Ça plane pour moi", though in fact the song had been sung and produced by its composer Lou Deprijck with the engineer Phil Delire for RKM/Vogue at Studio Morgan in Brussels. Plastic Bertrand received only 0.5% of the song's royalties. A few months earlier, Deprijck had cooperated with Elton Motello (aka Alan Ward), who wrote English lyrics for the same track and recorded it as "Jet Boy, Jet Girl".

Plastic Bertrand toured Europe, Japan, Australia and North America with Lou Deprijck, becoming one of the few French-speaking artists to appear in the Billboard chart. He also appeared on a number of major television shows, presenting "Jackpot" on TF1, "Destination Noël" on France 2, "Due Per Tutti" on Rai 2 and "Supercool" on RTBF, which he also produced. However, Plastic Bertrand's first three albums were in fact entirely sung in the studio by  Deprijck and not by Jouret.

Between 1982 and 1985, he lived in Milan, and millions of Italians followed his adventures in a photo-story of which he was the star. With Daniel Balavoine and ABBA's Anni-Frid Lyngstad, he recorded Abbacadabra, a musical tale for children. In the early 1980s, he appeared in movies such as Légitime Violence and the short film Baoum. Working with Vladimir Cosma, he wrote several film scores, including Astérix et la surprise de César (Asterix Versus Caesar).

In 1987, he represented Luxembourg in the Eurovision Song Contest with the song "Amour Amour".  This failed to impress the juries, however, scoring only 4 points and placing 21st out of 22 entries.

During the 1990s, Bertrand explored other facets of music, including songwriting and producing, and also recorded the album Suite Diagonal for Sony in 1994 with Jacques Lanzmann. Forming the company MMD with Pierrette Broodthaers, he produced two albums for David Janssen, an album of classical music with a Turkish contemporary influence for harpsichord and organ with Leila Pinar, an album of traditional Balkan music with the Kazansky choir, and a single for Noël Godin, "Chantilly c'est parti". Bertrand's track "Stop ou Encore" (the voice on the tape is actually Lou Deprijck's voice) featured prominently in the 1999 film Three Kings.

"Ça plane pour moi" is featured in the 1985 picture National Lampoon's European Vacation, in Danny Boyle's 2010 film 127 Hours, in 2011 as the opening title theme for Jackass 3.5 (2011), in the 2012 film Ruby Sparks, in the 2013 film The Wolf of Wall Street, and in the trailer for the 2018 film Super Troopers 2. The song is also used as the soundtrack for a commercial spot for Time Warner Cable in the United States (April 2011). It is also in the 2018 video game, Just Dance 2019, despite being a cover.

Comeback
Twenty years after "Ça plane pour moi", Bertrand returned to the public eye as MTV declared him the "most wanted comeback artist". He made a guest appearance on the album Get Ready!, and rerecorded the 1982 song "Stop ou encore", which went originally platinum in Belgium. A "best of" album was released in 1998 on the Universal-AMC label, Bertrand himself handling the remastering process.

Aside from a resurgence in his musical career, Plastic Bertrand made numerous guest appearances on European television, and presented the fortnightly show Duel for two seasons at RTBF. He also worked with Pierrette Broodthaers to open the "Broodthaers & Bertrand" art gallery, and worked with the Museum of Contemporary Art in Valenciennes and Belgian artist Jacques Charlier to produce 120 Andy Warhol-style portraits.

In 2001, Bertrand toured Belgium, France, Switzerland and Germany with a series of concerts, and composed a number of new songs. He also made appearances on Channel 4's Eurotrash show and BBC Two's chat show Clarkson.

In 2002, he signed a new contract and recorded his eighth album Ultra terrestre, released in Belgium in 2002. In September and November the same year, he managed the TV talent contest Star Academy on RTL-TVI.

In March 2003, to celebrate 25 years since the beginning of his successful solo career, Bertrand performed a concert at the Cirque Royal in Brussels, performing new songs and past hits with a philharmonic orchestra, and singing in duet with guest singers.

From July to September 2003, he presented the TV show Hit Story on France 3. During his comeback, he appeared on a special 1980s edition of Le Maillon Faible, the French equivalent of The Weakest Link. He won €1,150 for charity. He appeared at the Countdown Spectacular 2 Tour from 18 August to 5 September 2007 in all major capital cities of Australia.

Legal issues
In 2010, an expert appointed by a court stated that the voice of Lou Deprijck, the composer/producer of "Ça plane pour moi", on a record from 2006 is the same voice as on the original 1977 recording. "Today it appears from the report of the experts that the voice of 'Ça plane pour moi' is Lou Deprijck's voice," stated the newspaper La Dernière Heure on Monday, 26 July 2010. Plastic Bertrand previously disputed the allegation, but on 28 July 2010 the singer finally revealed that he is indeed not the singer of any of the songs in the first four albums released under the name Plastic Bertrand.

Discography

References

External links

 Official site
 Ça plane pour Lou !
 Plastic Bertrand: World Scrabble Champion?
 Soundtrack Used In Pepsi Commercial
 Belgian singer Plastic Bertrand denies allegations over hit song
 Entry at discogs.com
 
 

Belgian male singers
Eurovision Song Contest entrants for Luxembourg
Eurovision Song Contest entrants of 1987
Musicians from Brussels
1954 births
Living people
New wave musicians
La Ferme Célébrités participants
Attic Records (Canada) artists
Belgian people of French descent
Belgian people of Ukrainian descent
Sire Records artists
French-language singers of Belgium
Royal Conservatory of The Hague alumni
Walloon musicians